Sir William Ernest George Johnston, DL (31 October 1884 – 26 October 1951) was a Unionist politician and businessman in Northern Ireland.

Life and career
Born in Belfast, William Johnston was the son of Rt. Hon. Sir James Johnston, of Belvoir Park.  Educated at Campbell College, Belfast and the Queen's University of Belfast he then entered his father's firm, James Johnston & Co. Ltd., flax merchants based at Donegall Street in Belfast. Thus, like many of his contemporaries, Sir William's family was involved in Ulster's thriving linen trade.

In Belfast's civic life, Sir William was High Sheriff and Lord Mayor of Belfast from May 1949 to May 1951, and an ex officio member of the Senate of Northern Ireland, the upper house of the Stormont Parliament. He was knighted in the 1951 King's Birthday Honours List.

Personal life
In 1912 he married Olive Patterson, the daughter of Rev. Dr. William Patterson, of Cooke Church, Toronto, Ontario, Canada. The couple had one son and lived at Wellington Park, Malone Road, Belfast, where Sir William died in 1951.

References
Who Was Who 1955

Lord Mayors of Belfast
1884 births
1951 deaths
High Sheriffs of Belfast
Members of the Senate of Northern Ireland 1949–1953
People educated at Campbell College
Ulster Unionist Party members of the Senate of Northern Ireland
Alumni of Queen's University Belfast
Deputy Lieutenants of Belfast
Knights Bachelor